Taylor Parsons (born Chris Webb Parsons; 4 February 1985) is an Australian professional rock climber and boulderer who was Australia's strongest climber in the late 2000s to early 2010s; completing the second ascent of Dai Koyamada's The Wheel of Life (2007) and doing the first free ascent of White Ladder (2004), Australia's first-ever grade 34  sport climbing route.

Personal life
Taylor was born Chris Webb Parsons in England on 4 February 1985, but grew up in Canberra in Australia from age 2 or 3. In a 2014 interview with Rock & Ice, Parsons said that he found school difficult and was frequently in trouble, often getting in fights to defend his mother who had come out as being gay.  During his rock climbing career, Parsons has frequently worked as a rope access technician, and on oil rigs.  As Chris, he was for a time married to his then-wife Teegan, and also later dated US rock climber, Alex Puccio.

In a 2021 podcast with climbing filmmaker Niall Grimes, it was revealed that Parsons had: "... fallen out of climbing and, after years of dark struggles, has now transitioned into mum-of-three, Taylor".

Notable ascents

Routes
2004. White Ladder 34 , Nowra NSW, Australia. First Ascent; the first-ever Australian to climb at grade 5.14c.
Motor Pussy 34  Blue Mountains, Australia. First Ascent.
Anal Palm 33  Blue Mountains, Australia. First Ascent.
Hats and Hoods 33  Nowra NSW, Australia. First Ascent.
Stranger on the Shore 33  Nowra NSW, Australia. First Ascent.
Mechanical Animals 33  Blue Mountains, Australia. The first ascent was by Ben Cossey.
Morpheus 33 . Nassereith, Austria; first-ever 33 climbed by an Australian overseas.

Boulders
2007. The Wheel of Life V15, Grampians National Park, Australia. Second Ascent.
2008. Progressive Aggression V15, Sydney, Australia. First Ascent. 
2010. Believe in Two V15, Magic Wood, Switzerland. First Ascent.
2012. Desperanza V15, Hueco Tanks, USA. Second Ascent. 
2013. Belly of the Beast V15, Raven Tor, England. First Ascent.
2013. Insanity of Grandeur V15, Chironico, Switzerland. Third ascent.
2006. Worm V14, Nowra NSW, Australia. First Ascent; the first-ever Australian to climb at grade V14.
2007. Catalyst V14, Crumbly crag, Sydney, Australia. First Ascent
2007. Never Ending Story V14  Magic Wood, Switzerland. Third ascent and first-ever V14 climbed by an Australian overseas.
2008. Purring Puma V14, Zillertal, Austria. First Ascent.

Competition climbing

IFSC World Cup Bouldering Competitions
2011 World Cup Series –  Vail leg –  6th

Other Competitions
2013 – Rock Master, Arco, Italy – 3rd
2008 – Austrian Bouldering Championships – 2nd
2008 – NSW State Bouldering Championships – 1st
2008 – NSW Bouldering Series – 1st
2007 – Oceania Onsight Championships – 1st
2007 – Australian Bouldering Championships – 1st

See also
Fred Nicole, leader of modern bouldering
Transgender people in sports

References

External links
 
CHRISTOPHER WEBB-PARSONS, IFSC competition database (2023)
VIDEO: Chris Webb Parsons' Hangboard Training Program, Climbing (March, 2013)
VIDEO: "Don't Blink" The Story of Chris Webb Parsons, Rock & Ice (February, 2014)

Living people
1985 births
Australian people of English descent
Australian rock climbers
Transgender sportswomen
LGBT climbers
Australian LGBT sportspeople